Hy-Line Cruises (colloquially referred to as Hy-Line, and legally Hyannis Harbor Tours Inc.) is a family owned and operated Massachusetts ferry and cruise company.  The company currently operates the second largest passenger ferry service between mainland Cape Cod and the islands of Martha's Vineyard and Nantucket (after the Steamship Authority). The company also operates sightseeing cruises and fishing charters. The company's main office is located at 22 Channel Point Road in Hyannis.

History
Hy-Line Cruises began operations in 1962 as Hyannis Harbor Tours run by Richard Scudder and his brother Robert. Originally, the company focused on sightseeing harbor tours, which it still does today. The company added deep-sea fishing charters in 1966 and started running seasonal passenger-ferry services in 1970, first to Martha's Vineyard and then to Nantucket in 1972 when Hyannis Harbor Tours bought out The Nantucket Boat Company, which at that time was doing business as Hi-line. Hyannis Harbor Tours took this trade name and changed it to Hy-Line.

In 1995, Hy-Line Cruises started the first high-speed catamaran service to Nantucket; its original vessel was shortly replaced by a larger one in 1997, which in turn was replaced in 2003 by the Grey Lady. Hy-Line introduced high-speed service to Martha's Vineyard in 2005, using its 1997-built ferry Lady Martha.  Another high-speed catamaran, Grey Lady IV, was delivered in 2016 to replace Hy-Line's monohull vessel, the Great Point on the Nantucket route.

Current operations

Island ferry service
Hy-Line Cruises operates high-speed catamaran ferry service between Hyannis and Nantucket (year-round) and Hyannis and Oak Bluffs, Martha's Vineyard (seasonally).  The journey time is approximately one hour. The company also operates inter-island trips between Martha's Vineyard and Nantucket.

All of Hy-Line Cruises ferry services are passenger only (although bicycles are carried for a small fee) due to the legal monopoly held on vehicle ferry service that is held by the Steamship Authority. Any new Hy-Line services must be approved by the authority, which serves as a regulatory body for service to and from the Islands.

Sightseeing cruises
Hy-Line Cruises also operates seasonal sightseeing cruises in and around Hyannis Harbor, and the Cape Cod Canal, (the latter sailing from the Wareham village of Onset).

Fishing
Out of Hyannis, Hy-Line operates seasonal half-day deep sea fishing trips in Nantucket Sound. The fishing boats, Sea Queen II and Sea Swan, go out daily in the Spring and Summer to fish in Nantucket Sound. They offer bottom fishing trips for scup and black sea bass, along with Captain's Choice trips for whatever the captain thinks will be the best fishing.

Fleet

Former fleet
Hy-Line also acquired two vessels upon purchasing the Nantucket Boat Company in 1972.

See also
The Steamship Authority

References

External links
 

1962 establishments in Massachusetts
Barnstable, Massachusetts
Companies based in Barnstable County, Massachusetts
Ferry companies of Massachusetts
Martha's Vineyard
Transport companies established in 1962
Transportation in Barnstable County, Massachusetts
Transportation in Dukes County, Massachusetts
Transportation in Nantucket, Massachusetts